Ann Bradshaw may refer to:
Ann Bradshaw, fictional character in the Gemma Doyle Trilogy
Ann Maria Bradshaw (1801–1862), English actress and vocalist
Ann Bradshaw (swimmer) (born 1957), British Olympic swimmer